BurritoVille is a New York City-based quick-service food chain serving Tex-Mex cuisine, established in 1992. Until 2008, there were 16 locations in Manhattan, one in Westbury, New York on Long Island, and one in Hoboken, NJ. The menu items consist mostly of various types of burritos and tacos, as well as salads and nachos. Many of the items are vegetarian.  

The chain's slogan is, "We're Mexcellent!"  Interior decor consists of antique maps of Mexico and classic sensational horror and romance Mexican cinema posters.

In September 2008, Burritoville closed all its Manhattan locations as a result of filing for reorganization under the bankruptcy laws. However, the Westbury location remained open for business.  In November 2008, one of the former owners of Blimpie purchased BurritoVille and directed a complete makeover of the chain. The Financial District location (36 Water Street), which re-opened in July 2009, was the first of several planned locations in New York City and throughout the country. The 23rd Street location reopened in the fall of 2009.

In 2011, Burritoville's website listed only its 23rd Street restaurant in Manhattan as an active location.  As of late 2014, the website listed only a single restaurant located in Jersey City, New Jersey.

See also
 List of Tex-Mex restaurants

Notes

External links

Fast-food chains of the United States
Mexican restaurants in the United States
Regional restaurant chains in the United States
Restaurants established in 1992
Restaurants in Manhattan
Tex-Mex restaurants
1992 establishments in New York City